Dorcadion semilucens is a species of beetle in the family Cerambycidae. It was described by Kraatz in 1873. It is known from Armenia and Azerbaijan. It contains the varietas Dorcadion semilucens var. lactescens.

References

semilucens
Beetles described in 1873